Fabio Fognini defeated Dušan Lajović in the final, 6–3, 6–4 to win the singles tennis title at the 2019 Monte-Carlo Masters. It was his first ATP Tour Masters 1000 title.

Rafael Nadal was the three-time defending champion, but lost in the semifinals to Fognini.

Seeds
The top eight seeds receive a bye into the second round.

Draw

Finals

Top half

Section 1

Section 2

Bottom half

Section 3

Section 4

Qualifying

Seeds

Qualifiers

Lucky loser
  Taro Daniel

Qualifying draw

First qualifier

Second qualifier

Third qualifier

Fourth qualifier

Fifth qualifier

Sixth qualifier

Seventh qualifier

References

External links
 Main draw
 Qualifying draw

2019 ATP Tour
2019 in Monégasque sport
Singles